Thonnurkara  is a village in Thrissur district in the state of Kerala, India.

Demographics
 India census, Thonnurkara had a population of 6287 with 2984 males and 3303 females.

References

Villages in Thrissur district